Bluebeard is a 1982 novel by the Swiss writer Max Frisch. It tells the story of a medical doctor who is accused of murdering his ex-wife. It was Frisch's last novel.

Reception
Hans Mayer of Die Zeit called Bluebeard "A beautiful new story, which with Montauk and Holocene clearly rounds off an epic triptych. Reinhard Baumgart of Der Spiegel described it as "very taciturn, yes a quiet book", and wrote that "In parts, the story truly speaks the embarrassing, suggestive and all but naked language of dreams, of the repression of a very bright and sometimes also too weakly lit dream."

Film
 (1984, TV film directed by Krzysztof Zanussi), with Vadim Glowna, Margarethe von Trotta, Barbara Lass, Karin Baal, Vera Tschechowa, Maja Komorowska, Elisabeth Trissenaar

See also
 1982 in literature
 Swiss literature

References

External links
 Max Frisch discusses Bluebeard with Michael Hamburger - a British Library sound recording

1982 novels
German-language novels
Novels by Max Frisch
Swiss novels adapted into television shows
Swiss novels adapted into films